David James "Matt" Healy (born 16 July 1970) is an English actor born in Scotland. He is best known for his roles as Matthew King in  Emmerdale from 2004 to 2008 and in The Bill as Alan Morton.

Background
When he was three years old his family moved from Paisley to Oldham, Lancashire, where he was brought up. He attended Oldham College and the University of Salford. After leaving college he travelled abroad until deciding to take up acting as a full-time career, but admits that he spent a lot of time "resting" and taking on manual jobs between finding roles. When he started acting he used the stage name Matt Healy because there was already an actor named David Healy. In 1997, he toured in the stage play Girls' Night Out, playing a gay stripper.

He briefly played the part of a policeman in Coronation Street. He has also been in The Bill, Playing the Field and Holby City. He was almost considering giving up acting when, in 2004, he auditioned for the role of devious Matthew King on Emmerdale.

In March 2017 he appeared in an episode of the BBC daytime drama Doctors, titled "Surveillance".

Emmerdale
He made his first Emmerdale appearance on 4 March 2004, as the character Matthew King. He was in the soap for nearly five years and made his last screen appearance on 16 December 2008, when the character was killed on his ill-fated wedding day.

Theatre
Between March and April 2009, he appeared as Clyde in The Murder Game at the King's Head Theatre, Islington.

He toured the UK in the comedy The Tart and the Vicar's Wife between July and November 2009. He starred alongside Christopher Villiers in 'Inside Job' that toured theatres like Theatre Clwyd, Mold from 13 September through 18 December 2010.

Panto

Matt Healy appeared as Captain Hook in Peter Pan at the Theatre Severn, Shrewsbury, Shropshire between December 2009 and January 2010. He appeared along with Disney Channel's icon Samantha Dorrance who played Wendy in the pantomime.
December 2010 to January 2011 Matt once again starred as Captain Hook. This time in the Weymouth Pavilion (Dorset) production of Peter Pan.

Filmography
 The Things You Do for Love: Against the Odds (1998) (TV) as 1st Drunk
 This Is Personal: The Hunt for the Yorkshire Ripper (2000) as DC Rogan
 Lenny Henry in Pieces (2000) (TV)
 The Bill (2001) as Alan Morton
 Mersey Beat (2001) as Greg
 Playing the Field (2002) as Les
 Holby City (2003) as Barry Andrews
 Emmerdale (2004–2008) as Matthew King
 Freight (2009) as Geoff - Building Foreman
 Casualty (2009) as PC Callaghan
 Soul Flowers (2009) as Andy Butters
 The Best Years (2010) as Jackie 'Giggles' McGarrigle
 No Quarter (2012) as Geoff
 Dementamania (2013) as William Hawkes

References

External links

Digital Spy Interview with Matt Healy

1970 births
Alumni of the University of Salford
Living people
Male actors from Oldham
Male actors from Paisley, Renfrewshire
Scottish male film actors
Scottish male soap opera actors
Scottish male television actors
20th-century Scottish male actors
21st-century Scottish male actors